Ruth Anderson, QC has extensive experience of the criminal justice system. She was admitted as a solicitor in 1972, and as an advocate in 1991, taking silk in 1999.  Her practice at the Bar has been principally a criminal one, defending in the High Court of Justiciary. She also served as an Advocate Depute from 1998 until January 2001. Miss Anderson has had local government experience and has also worked in private practice as a solicitor. She was appointed a part-time Sheriff in May 2003 and a full-time sheriff in September 2006. Ruth Anderson now owns a bookshop in Wigtown, name'd Well-Read Books of Wigtown.

SCCRC
Ruth Anderson QC has been a Board Member of the Scottish Criminal Cases Review Commission (SCCRC) since 1 January 2002. The SCCRC is currently conducting a review of the conviction of Abdelbaset al-Megrahi in the Pan Am Flight 103 bombing trial. The commission is expected to complete the review and announce its conclusions in the first half of 2007.

External links
Management of the SCCRC
Appointment as part-time sheriff
Appointment as a sheriff

Scottish lawyers
Living people
Scottish King's Counsel
Year of birth missing (living people)
Place of birth missing (living people)
British women lawyers